Tochimatoi Yuko (born Yuji Imai; January 30, 1959 – January 7, 2012) was a sumo wrestler from Kawasaki, Kanagawa, Japan. He made his professional debut in September January 1975, and reached the top division in May 1985. His highest rank was maegashira 11. He retired in March 1989.

Career record

See also
Glossary of sumo terms
List of past sumo wrestlers
List of sumo tournament second division champions

References

1959 births
Japanese sumo wrestlers
Sumo people from Kanagawa Prefecture
2012 deaths